Bala Gopaludu  is a 1989 Indian Telugu-language film produced by M. R. V. Prasad under the P. B. R. Art Productions banner and directed by Kodi Ramakrishna. It stars Nandamuri Balakrishna, Suhasini  and music composed by Raj–Koti. This film is the debut of Nandamuri Kalyan Ram as child artist.

Plot 
The film begins in a village where Narasimham a bent & vandal who racks the farmers, conspires to squat on the barren lands of peasants and cowers on them. Bangaru Muvva Bala Gopalam a venturous dares to stymie the venoms of Narasimham. Suddenly, two orphans Raju & Lakshmi who absconded from the orphanage owing to a grave penalty arrives. Hitherto, they prepare to adopt a father for their caretaking, by esteeming Gopalam's idolization and benignancy they cleverly dwell at his residence. Pronto, he gets congenial towards them, so, embraces them as his children, and also promises to never pronounce them orphans. 

Besides, Rekha a supercilious medico is the daughter of a tycoon Shekar Rao a snob. Once, she appears in the village on grounds of a medical camp when Gopalam indignities her friends. Beholding Rekha, the children crave to possess her as their mother by knitting with their foster father but she misses her. To trace her, they advertise Gopalam’s photograph in the matrimony for the bride to which he is unbeknownst. Rekha keeps an eye on it because of conjecture she thinks all wet regarding Gopalam and she decides to crack down on him. Therefore, she gets close to Gopalam counterfeiting as a rustic Subba Lakshmi whom he wholeheartedly loves and prepares to espouse her. 

Just before the wedding, Rekha unwraps her play-act and mocks Gopalam. At once, he challenges to win back Rekha as the mother of his children and originates in the city. Interim, Shekar Rao makes Rekha’s betrothals with his stealthy nephew Govinda Babu which she detests. At this step, Rekha fathoms the excellence of Gopalam and walks with him. Between times, Narasimham snares the village when Forthwith, Shekar Rao & Govinda Babu inflict to retract Rekha and whisk with Narasimham. The two below the belt, on treachery, detach children from Gopalam and also cabal to vandalize the village. At last, Gopalam hiatus his ruse, and the children also break the prison. Finally, the movie ends on a happy note with the children conjoining with Gopalam.

Cast 

Nandamuri Balakrishna as Bangaru Muvva Bala Gopalam
Suhasini as Rekha
Rao Gopal Rao as Narasimham
Allu Ramalingaiyah as Lingaiah
Jaggayya as Chandra Shekar Rao
Mohan Babu as Govinda Babu
Giri Babu as Tikkanna
Mallikarjuna Rao as School Master
Chitti Babu as Raj
Hema Sundar as Narasaiah
Bhimiswara Rao as Officer
Madan Mohan as Drama Artist
Jaya Bhaskar as Orphanage Warden
Chidatala Appa Rao as Kung Fu master
Tata Appa Rao as Doctor
Gadiraju Subba Rao as Officer
Juttu Narasimham as Dead body
Hema  as Rekha's friend
Rekha as Kantham
Mamatha as Amba Shetty
Kuaili as Nagaratnam
Samyuktha as Rekha's friend
Master Nandamuri Kalyan Ram as Raja
Baby Raasi as Lakshmi

Soundtrack 

Music composed by Raj–Koti. Lyrics written by Veturi.

References

External links 

 

1980s Telugu-language films
1989 films
Films directed by Kodi Ramakrishna
Films scored by Raj–Koti